Valton is a surname. Notable people with the surname include:

Arvo Valton (born 1935), Estonian writer
Edmond Eugène Valton (1836–1910), French artist
Jules Valton (1867–unknown), French sailor

See also
Valton, Wisconsin, unincorporated community in the United States